Acrobasis craterantis is a species of snout moth in the genus Acrobasis. It was described by Edward Meyrick in 1933. It is found in the Congo Basin.

References

Moths described in 1933
Acrobasis
Moths of Africa